The Mosul Grand Mosque is an incomplete Sunni Islamic mosque located in Mosul, Iraq. The mosque is situated in the Taqafah district bordering the Tigris river near the Nineveh archeological site. Its construction started during the Saddam Hussein regime, but works were interrupted because of the political instability in the country and it remains incomplete to this day.

History
Arfajah ibn Harthamah, an Arab general during Rashidun Caliphate era, are recorded as  the first architect of the great Umayyad mosque of Mosul, which later further expanded and rebuilt by Marwan ibn Muhammad during the era of Umayyad Caliphate.

It is the largest mosque in Mosul and was previously called Saddam Mosque in honour of the Iraqi president, Saddam Hussein.

Nineveh Governorate municipality announced on 18 February 2019 that construction was resumed, albeit damages caused by ISIS, with a 50 million dollar grant from the United Arab Emirates. Completion date was not set.

See also

 Islam in Iraq
 List of mosques in Iraq

References

Buildings and structures under construction
Mosques in Mosul
Sunni mosques in Iraq